JS Zuiryū (SS-505) is the fifth boat of Sōryū-class submarines. She was commissioned on 6 March 2013.

Construction and career
Zuiryū was laid down at Mitsubishi Heavy Industries Kobe Shipyard on March 16, 2009, as the 2008 plan 2900-ton submarine No. 8120 based on the medium-term defense capability development plan. At the launching ceremony, it was named Zuiryū and launched on 20 October 2011. She's commissioned on 6 March 2013 and deployed to Yokosuka.

From July 1 to October 3, 2017, he participated in US dispatch training and conducted offshore training and facility utilization training in the Guam and Hawaiian Islands areas.

On September 30, 2018, the ship provided Shigeru Joshima and Tomoya Nagase with Navy curry on the NTV TV program "The! Tetsuwan! DASH !!"

From September 12 to December 18, 2019, he will participate in US dispatch training and conduct offshore training and facility use training in the Hawaiian Islands area.

Zuiryū’s homeport is Yokosuka.

Gallery

Citations

External links

2011 ships
Sōryū-class submarines
Ships built by Mitsubishi Heavy Industries